Alive is the twelfth studio album by Japanese band Do As Infinity, released on February 28, 2018. All the songs in the album were produced by Hiroyuki Sawano. Three singles were released in 2017. The song "Keshin no Juu" was used as the ending theme song for the anime Juni Taisen: Zodiac War. Three different editions of the album were released: a regular CD version, a CD+DVD, and a CD+Blu-ray limited edition.

Track listing
All music composed and arranged by Hiroyuki Sawano.

Charts

References

External links
 
ALIVE (CD) at Oricon 
ALIVE (CD+DVD) at Oricon 
ALIVE (CD+Blu-ray) at Oricon 

2018 albums
Do As Infinity albums
Hiroyuki Sawano albums
Avex Group albums